The following lists events that happened during 1858 in Chile.

Incumbents
President of Chile: Manuel Montt

Events

Births
16 April - Jorge Boonen (d. 1921)
27 December - Juan Luis Sanfuentes (d. 1930)

Deaths
18 July - Francisco Antonio Pinto (b. 1785)

References 

 
1850s in Chile
Chile
Chile
Years of the 19th century in Chile